Love and Death on Long Island is a novella written by Gilbert Adair and first published in 1990.

Adaptations 
It was adapted as a 1997 film, Love and Death on Long Island, directed by Richard Kwietniowski and starring Jason Priestley, John Hurt and Fiona Loewi.
It was adapted as a stage play with music by Ben Parry, book and libretto by Gilbert Adair himself, directed by Edward Williams with Anna Carteret, Gordon Fraser and Richard O'Callaghan in London's West End in 2008.

1990 British novels
Novels by Gilbert Adair
British novels adapted into films
Scottish novellas
Heinemann (publisher) books